Żukowo railway station is a railway station serving the town of Żukowo, in the Pomeranian Voivodeship, Poland. The station opened in on 1 October 2015 and is located on the Nowa Wieś Wielka–Gdynia Port railway. The train services are operated by SKM Tricity. Construction of the station was completed in 2014.

Train services
The station is served by the following services:

Pomorska Kolej Metropolitalna services (R) Kartuzy — Gdańsk Port Lotniczy (Airport) — Gdańsk Główny 
Pomorska Kolej Metropolitalna services (R) Kościerzyna — Gdańsk Port Lotniczy (Airport) — Gdańsk Wrzeszcz — Gdynia Główna
Pomorska Kolej Metropolitalna services (R) Kościerzyna — Gdańsk Osowa — Gdynia Główna

References

 This article is based upon a translation of the Polish language version as of July 2016.

Railway stations in Poland opened in 2015
Railway stations in Pomeranian Voivodeship
Kartuzy County